Artiodus is an extinct genus of cartilaginous fish from the Permian period. The name comes from the type locality, the Arti River, combined with the Greek word for "tooth." It is currently monotypic, containing only the species A. prominens from the Early Permian of the Middle Urals of Russia. As with many Paleozoic chondrichthyian genera, its affinities are unclear at this time.

References

Permian Russia
Permian sharks
Cartilaginous fish